Kevin Arthur Moore (born 29 July 1990) is a sprinter competing internationally for Malta. He initially represented Australia before switching allegiance to Malta, the country of birth of his late father, where Kevin also lived for the first six years of his life. He competed in the 400 metres at the 2013 World Championships without advancing from the first round.

In June 2016, he tested positive for three illegal substances and was banned from competition for four years. His sanction lasted from 11 June 2016 until 24 September 2020.

He is of Greek Cypriot Australian descent, through his mother.

International competitions

1Representing Asia-Pacific

Personal bests
Outdoor
100 metres – 10.49 (0.0 m/s, Zürich 2014)
200 metres – 21.03 (-0.4 m/s, Zürich 2014)
400 metres – 46.13 (Sydney 2010)

References

External links

1990 births
Living people
Maltese male sprinters
Australian male sprinters
Athletes (track and field) at the 2010 Commonwealth Games
Athletes (track and field) at the 2014 Commonwealth Games
Commonwealth Games competitors for Malta
Maltese people of Australian descent
Maltese people of Greek Cypriot descent
People of Greek Cypriot descent
Australian people of Maltese descent
Australian people of Greek Cypriot descent
Commonwealth Games medallists in athletics
Commonwealth Games gold medallists for Australia
Doping cases in athletics
Maltese sportspeople in doping cases
Medallists at the 2010 Commonwealth Games